Statistics of Bahraini Premier League in the 1965–66 season.

Overview
Muharraq Club won the championship.

References
RSSSF

Bahraini Premier League seasons
Bah
1965–66 in Bahraini football